Michael B. Buser (born January 10, 1952) is a judge of the Kansas Court of Appeals.  He was appointed to this position in January 2005 by Governor Sebelius.

Biography
Judge Buser was born on January 10, 1952, in Kansas City, Missouri.  He graduated from Georgetown University in 1974 with degrees in theology and American government.  He went on to receive his J.D. degree from the University of Kansas School of Law in 1977.  He is now married and has two sons.

Legal career
Judge Buser began his legal career in 1977 as an assistant district attorney in Johnson County.  In 1988, he became the general attorney for the Union Pacific Railroad.  He then joined the law firm Shook, Hardy and Bacon in 1991 and worked in the firm's tort and pharmaceutical practice groups until his appointment to the Court of Appeals.

References

External links
 Kansas Court of Appeals website

Kansas Court of Appeals Judges
Living people
1952 births
People from Kansas City, Missouri
Georgetown University alumni
University of Kansas School of Law alumni
20th-century American lawyers
21st-century American lawyers
21st-century American judges